Alexandre (Alexander) Robillard (1843–1907) was a Canadian politician. He was a Liberal Member of the Legislative Assembly of Ontario for Russell from 1886 to 1898.

He was born in Gloucester Township, Ontario in the year 1843 and studied in Ottawa. Robillard was involved in the operation of quarries providing material for construction in Gloucester Township. In 1883, he ran unsuccessfully for Russell against his brother, Honoré. Both he and his brother served as reeve for the township.

Alexandre married Sophie Lafleur. After her death, he later married Clara Caron.

External links 

The Canadian parliamentary companion, 1891 JA Gemmill

1843 births
1907 deaths
Franco-Ontarian people
Mayors and reeves of Gloucester Township, Ontario
Ontario Liberal Party MPPs